Dhiraj Pratap Singh is the 29th and current Inspector General of Nepal Police. He was appointed as the Chief of Nepal Police after succeeding Shailesh Thapa Chhetri on 3 May 2022 following a cabinet decision.

Biography  

Singh joined Nepal Police as an Inspector on March 24, 1993. He also serving as the incumbent Head of INTERPOL National Central Bureau, Kathmandu as an ex officio. Singh was promoted as Additional IG on March, 2022. Prior to join as IGP, he served as Central Investigation Bureau. Before that, he was chief of the police force in Madhes Province as a Deputy Inspector General.
As DIG, Singh also lead the Central Bureau of Investigation. As the Superintendent of Police, Singh commanded the Dang district.

The appointment of Singh is apparently a violation of the seniority order in the Nepal police as he was the third-ranked officer in the police department after Bishwa Raj Pokharel and Sahakul Thapa. But he got promoted by superseding them. In this context Pokharel had filed a write petition to the Supreme Court demanding that the government’s decision to promote his junior Dhiraj Pratap Singh. Though Pokharel’s writ has been quashed by Nepal Supreme court.

References

Nepalese police officers
Inspectors General of Police (Nepal)
Living people
1967 births